Electrium is a German-owned  British manufacturer of electrical wiring accessories, circuit protection, cable management, and control equipment.

Electrium has three sites across the UK as of 2014: the main factory in Wythenshawe, Manchester,
the distribution center at Hindley Green, Wigan, and the head office at Cannock, West Midlands.

The company is under the ownership of Siemens AG UK.

Brand names

Siemens 

After the takeover of Electrium Sales Ltd by Siemens AG in 2005, Electrium began to manufacture and distribute Siemens branded circuit protection and electrical equipment.

Crabtree 

J. A. Crabtree & Co was founded in 1919 by John Ashworth Crabtree.
The company became one of Britain's leading manufacturers of electrical accessories, low voltage switchgear and motor control gear. In 1972, the company was acquired by the British Ever Ready Electrical Company, which was itself acquired by Hanson Trust in 1981. For many years the company was based at the Lincoln Works in Walsall, Staffordshire, which was closed in 1997.

Volex 

Ward & Goldstone Ltd. was founded in 1892 by James Henry Ward and Meyer Hart Goldstone.
The company's  Volex Accessories brand is now part of the Electrium Group and manufactures and sells circuit protection and wiring accessories.

Wylex 

George H. Scholes Ltd. was founded in the mid-1920s by George Hamer Scholes to manufacture electrical accessories and fuse boxes. In 1934, he built the Wylex Works at Wythenshawe, near Manchester. 

The company's Wylex brand consumer units still dominate the UK market. However, in recent years RCD protected consumer units have generally replaced the old rewireable fuse units. Parent company Siemens have now begun manufacturing the MCBs used in the more of the company's products in Europe.

Appleby 

H. & L. Appleby Ltd. was founded in 1840. The company's factory was in Short Heath, Willenhall, Staffordshire. 

The company offers a comprehensive range of pattress boxes, dry lining boxes and bulkhead light fittings.

Marbo 

Marbourn Ltd. was a British manufacturer of electrical accessories, based in the North East of England. The company closed its factory in Hartlepool in 2000.

Other uses 
There is also a science museum in Sainte-Julie, Quebec called Electrium, see Électrium .

References 

Siemens